Piligena is a genus of parasitic flies in the family Tachinidae. There is one described species in Piligena, P. mackieae.

Distribution
South Africa, Zimbabwe.

References

Dexiinae
Diptera of Africa
Monotypic Brachycera genera
Tachinidae genera